Ikeshima or Ikejima, also sometimes listed as Ike Island, is an island in Nagasaki Prefecture, Japan. It formerly employed thousands of coal miners who lived on the island. The coal mines opened in 1959 and closed in 2001. The number of miners was reported to be 8,000, or over 10,000.As of 2018, 130 individuals, mostly retired miners or their relatives, remained on the island.

Etymology
The island is named after the former pond on the island, named Kagamigaike. The pond was destroyed in favour of turning it into a port. "Ike" translates to pond, so litteraly Ikeshima means "Pond Island".

Gallery

References

External links

Exploration for Black Gold & The World Heritage "Church of the Sea" J-Trip Plan, NHK, April 15, 2019 (video, 28 minutes)

Videos of Ikeshima (October 2022):
https://vt.tiktok.com/ZS8JTUwey/
https://vt.tiktok.com/ZS8JTL14j/
https://vt.tiktok.com/ZS8JTrdXf/

Islands of Nagasaki Prefecture
Coal mines in Japan